"The Supermen" is a song written by English singer-songwriter David Bowie in 1970 and released as the closing track on the album The Man Who Sold the World. It was one of a number of pieces on the album inspired by the works of literary figures such as Friedrich Nietzsche and H. P. Lovecraft.

Music and lyrics
The song has been cited as reflecting the influence of German Romanticism, its theme and lyrics referencing the apocalyptic visions of Friedrich Nietzsche and its prominent timpani part being likened to Richard Strauss' Also Sprach Zarathustra. Bowie later said "I was still going through the thing when I was pretending that I understood Nietzsche... And I had tried to translate it into my own terms to understand it so 'Supermen' came out of that." Critics have also seen the influence of H. P. Lovecraft's stories of "dormant elder gods".

According to Bowie himself the guitar riff was given to him by Jimmy Page when the latter, who was Shel Talmy's session guitarist in the mid-1960s, played on one of Bowie's early releases, "I Pity the Fool". The riff was later used on another Bowie song, "Dead Man Walking", from the Earthling album in 1997.

Live versions
An early performance of the song, by the Hype, on the BBC show Sounds of the 70s: Andy Ferris, recorded in March 1970, was released for the first time in 2016 on the vinyl edition of the album Bowie at the Beeb.
Bowie and Ronson played the song on the BBC show Sounds of the 70s: Bob Harris on 21 September 1971. This was broadcast on 4 October 1971 and was released in 2000 on Bowie at the Beeb.
A live version recorded at the Boston Music Hall on 1 October 1972 was released in 1989 on the original Sound + Vision box set, but was not included in subsequent versions of this compilation. However, the same track appeared on the bonus disc of the Aladdin Sane – 30th Anniversary Edition in 2003.
Another live version recorded at Santa Monica Civic Auditorium on 20 October 1972 was released on Santa Monica '72 and Live Santa Monica '72.

Other releases
An alternate version of the song was recorded on 12 November 1971 during sessions for The Rise and Fall of Ziggy Stardust and the Spiders from Mars. It first appeared on the album Revelations – A Musical Anthology for Glastonbury Fayre in July 1972, compiled by the organisers of Glastonbury Festival at which Bowie had played in 1971. It was later released as a bonus track on the Rykodisc CD and cassette reissue of Hunky Dory in 1990, and again on the Ziggy Stardust – 30th Anniversary Reissue bonus disc in 2002. This version was sampled on "Culture Shock", from Death Grips's 2011 mixtape Exmilitary.

A November 1996 tour rehearsal recording of the song, which originally aired on a BBC radio broadcast in 1997, was released in 2020 on the album ChangesNowBowie.

Cover versions
 Doctor Mix and the Remix (aka Metal Urbain) – Wall of Noise (1979) 
 Aquaserge – Repetition – A Tribute to David Bowie (2010)

Personnel
David Bowie: lead and backing vocals
Mick Ronson: electric guitars, backing vocals
Tony Visconti: bass guitar, backing vocals
Woody Woodmansey: drums

Notes

David Bowie songs
1970 songs
Songs written by David Bowie
Song recordings produced by Tony Visconti